The Innu / Ilnu ("man", "person") or Innut / Innuat / Ilnuatsh ("people"), formerly called Montagnais from the French colonial period (French for "mountain people",), are the Indigenous inhabitants of territory in the northeastern portion of the present-day province of Labrador and some portions of Quebec. They refer to their traditional homeland as Nitassinan ("Our Land", ᓂᑕᔅᓯᓇᓐ) or Innu-assi ("Innu Land").

The Innu are divided into several bands, with the Montagnais being the southernmost group and the Naskapi being the northernmost. 

Their ancestors were known to have lived on these lands as hunter-gatherers for several thousand years. To support their seasonal hunting migrations, they created portable tents made of animal skins. Their subsistence activities were historically centred on hunting and trapping caribou, moose, deer, and small game.

Their language, Ilnu-Aimun or Innu-Aimun (popularly known since the French colonial era as Montagnais), is spoken throughout Nitassinan, with certain dialect differences. It is part of the Cree language group, and is unrelated to the Inuit languages of other nearby peoples.

The "Innu / Ilnu" consist of two regional tribal groups, which differ in dialect and partly also in their way of life and culture:
 the Ilnu, Nehilaw or "Western/Southern Montagnais" in the south, speak the "l"-dialect (Ilnu-Aimun or Nenueun/Neːhlweːuːn), and  
 the Innu or "Eastern Montagnais" ("Central/Moisie Montagnais", "Eastern/Lower North Shore Montagnais", and "Labrador/North West River Montagnais") live further north; they speak the "n"-dialect (Innu-Aimun)
Both groups are still called "Montagnais" in the official language of Crown-Indigenous Relations and Northern Development Canada. The Naskapi ("people beyond the horizon", ᓇᔅᑲᐱ), who live  further north, also identify as Innu or Iyiyiw.

Today, about 18,000 Innu live in eleven settlements within reserves in Québec and Labrador. To avoid confusion with the Inuit, who belong to the Eskimo peoples, today only the singular form "Innu / Ilnu" is used for the Innu, members of the large Cree-language family. The plural form of "Innut / Innuat / Ilnuatsh" has been abandoned.

Montagnais, Naskapi or Innu

The people are frequently classified by the geography of their primary locations:
the Neenoilno, live along the north shore of the Gulf of Saint Lawrence, in Quebec; they have historically been referred to by Europeans as Montagnais (French for "mountain people",), or Innu proper (Nehilaw and Ilniw – "people")
The Naskapi (also known as Innu and Iyiyiw), live farther north and are less numerous.  The Innu recognize several distinctions among their people (e.g. Mushuau Innuat, Maskuanu, Uashau Innuat) based on different regional affiliations and speakers of various dialects of the Innu language.

The word Naskapi was first recorded by French colonists in the 17th century. They applied it to distant Innu groups who were beyond the reach of Catholic missionary influence.  It was particularly applied to those people living in the lands that bordered Ungava Bay and the northern Labrador coast, near the Inuit communities of northern Quebec and northern Labrador.  Gradually it came to refer to the people known today as the Naskapi First Nation.

The Naskapi are traditionally nomadic peoples, in contrast with the more sedentary Montagnais, who establish settled territories.

The Mushuau Innuat (plural), while related to the Naskapi, split off from the tribe in the 1900s. They were subject to a government relocation program at Davis Inlet. Some of the families of the Naskapi Nation of Kawawachikamach have close relatives in the Cree village of Whapmagoostui, on the eastern shore of Hudson Bay.

Since 1990, the Montagnais people have generally chosen to be officially referred to as the Innu, which means human being in Innu-aimun. The Naskapi have continued to use the word Naskapi.

Innu communities

Labrador Communities

Natuashish
('Nat-wah-sheesh', formerly Davis Inlet (Utshimassits), home of the Mushuau Innu First Nation, Reserve: Natuashish #2, c. 43 km2, Population: 1,089) (Naskapi reserve)

Sheshatshiu
('Shesh-ah-shee', Tshishe-shatshu in standardized orthography, home of the Sheshatshiu Innu First Nation, Reserve: Sheshatshiu #3, ca. 8 km2, Population: 1,824)

Although Sheshatshiu and Natuashish are home to most of the province's Innu people, some also live at Labrador City, Wabush, Happy Valley-Goose Bay, St. John's, and elsewhere.

Quebec Communities

Mamit Innuat 
More of 3,300 members

1 Innus of Ekuanitshit || Ekuanitshit || 682
Ekuantshit (Mingan) (Ekuanitshu in standardized orthography, home of Les Innus de Ekuanitshit, Reserve: Mingan, c. 19 km2, Population: 685)

2 Montagnais de Natashquan || Natashquan ||1179
Natashquan (Nutashkuan in standardized orthography, home of the Montagnais de Natashquan, Reserve: Natashquan #1, c. 20 ha, Population: 1,214)

3 Montagnais de Pakua Shipi ||Pakuashipi (Saint-Augustin) || 394
Pakut-shipu (Montagnais de Pakua Shipi)
Reserve community: St. Augustin Indian Settlement,
Population: 398

4 Montagnais de Unamen Shipu || La Romaine ||1225
Unaman-shipu (Montagnais de Unamen Shipu)
Reserve: Romaine #2, c. 40 ha,
Population: 1,232

Conseil tribal Mamuitun
Around 17,000 members

1 Bande des Innus de Pessamit || Pessamit || 
Betsiamites (Pessamu in standardized orthography, home of the Bande des Innus de Pessamit, known also as 'Pessamit Innu Band', Reserve: Betsiamites, ca. 252 km2, Population: 4,041)and the capital of the Innus

2 Innu Takuaikan Uashat Mak Mani-Utenam || Sept-Îles || 
Uashat-Maliotenam (Innu Takuaikan Uashat Mak Mani-Utenam)
Reserves:
Maliotenam #27A, c. 16 km east of Sept-Îles,
Uashat #27 in the City of Sept-Îles, c. 6 km2,
Population: 4,813

3 Innue Essipit || Essipit || 790
Essipit (Essipu in standardized orthography, home of the Innue Essipit, also known as Essipit First Nation or 'Montagnais Essipit', Reserve: Innue Essipit (or 'Communaute Montagnaise Essipit'), c. 88 ha, Population: 886)

4 La Nation Innu Matimekush-Lac John || Schefferville || 1014
 La Nation Innu Matimekush-Lac John (also known as 'Innu Nation of Matimekush-Lac John', Reserve: Lac John, Matimekosh #3, c. 94 ha, Population: 1,040)
 Lac-John
Matimekosh (Matamekush in standardized orthography)

5 Pekuakamiulnuatsh First Nation || Mashteuiatsh || 
Mashteuiatsh (Matshiteuiau in standardized orthography, home of the Montagnais du Lac St.-Jean, also known as 'Première nation des Pekuakamiulnuatsh', autonym: 'Ilnuatsh du Pekuakami', Reserve: Mashteuiatsh, c. 15 km2, Population: 7,274)

Kawawachikamach
(Naskapi Nation of Kawawachikamach),
Reserve: Kawawachikamach, c. 49 km2,
Population 2020: 639

History

The Norsemen referred to the Innu as the Skræling in Greenlandic Norse. They referred to Nitassinan as Markland.

The Innu were historically allied with neighbouring Atikamekw, Maliseet and Algonquin peoples against their enemies, the Algonquian-speaking Mi'kmaq and Iroquoian-speaking Five Nations of the Iroquois Confederacy (known as Haudenosaunee. During the Beaver Wars (1609-1701), the Iroquois repeatedly invaded the Innu territories from their homelands south of the Great Lakes. They took women and young males as captive slaves, and plundered their hunting grounds in search of more furs. Since these raids were made by the Iroquois with unprecedented brutality, the Innu themselves adopted the torment, torture, and cruelty of their enemies.

The Naskapi, on the other hand, usually had to confront the southward advancing Inuit in the east of the peninsula.
Innu oral tradition describes the original encounters of the Innu and the French explorers led by Samuel de Champlain as fraught with distrust. Neither group understood the language of the other, and the Innu were concerned about the motives of the French explorers.

The French asked permission to settle on the Innu's coastal land,  which the Innu called Uepishtikueiau. This eventually developed as Quebec City. According to oral tradition, the Innu at first declined their request. The French demonstrated their ability to farm wheat on the land and promised they would share their bounty with the Innu in the future, which the Innu accepted.

Two distinct versions of the oral history describe the outcome. In the first, the French used gifts of farmed food and manufactured goods to encourage the Innu to become dependent on them. Then, the French changed it to a mercantile relationship: trading these items to the Innu in exchange for furs. When the nomadic Innu went inland for the winter, the French increased the size and population of their settlement considerably, eventually completely displacing the Innu.

The second, and more widespread, version of the oral history describes a more immediate conflict. In this version, the Innu taught the French how to survive in their traditional lands. Once the French had learned enough to survive on their own, they began to resent the Innu. The French began to attack the Innu, who retaliated in an attempt to reclaim their ancestral territory. The Innu had a disadvantage in numbers and weaponry, and eventually began to avoid the area rather than risk further defeat. During this conflict, the French colonists took many Innu women as wives. French women did not immigrate to New France in the early period.

French explorer Samuel de Champlain eventually became involved in the Innu's conflict with the Iroquois, who were ranging north from their traditional territory around the Great Lakes in present-day New York and Pennsylvania. On July 29, 1609, at Ticonderoga or Crown Point, New York, (historians are not sure which of these two places), Champlain and his party encountered a group of Iroquois, likely Mohawk, who were the easternmost tribe of the Five Nations of the Iroquois Confederacy.  A battle began the next day. As two hundred Iroquois advanced on Champlain's position, a native guide pointed out the three enemy chiefs to the French.  According to legend, Champlain fired his arquebus and killed two of the Mohawk chiefs with one shot; one of his men shot and killed the third.  The Mohawk reportedly fled the scene. Although the French also traded extensively with the Mohawk and other Iroquois, and converted some to Catholicism, they also continued to have armed conflicts with them.

Present status 
The Innu of Labrador and those living on the north shore of the Gulf of Saint-Lawrence in the Canadian Shield region have never officially ceded their territory to Canada by way of treaty or other agreement. But, as European-Canadians began widespread forest and mining operations at the turn of the 20th century, the Innu became increasingly settled in coastal communities and in the interior of Quebec. The Canadian and provincial governments, the Catholic, Moravian, and Anglican churches, all encouraged the Innu to settle in more permanent, majority-style communities, in the belief that their lives would improve with this adaptation. This coercive assimilation resulted in the Innue giving up some traditional activities (hunting, trapping, fishing). Because of these social disruptions and the systemic disadvantages faced by Indigenous peoples, community life in the permanent settlements often became associated with high levels of substance abuse, domestic violence, and suicide among the Innu.

Labrador Innu organizations and land claims 
In 1999, Survival International published a study of the Innu communities of Labrador.  It assessed the adverse effects of the Canadian government's relocating the people far from their ancestral lands and preventing them from practising their ancient way of life.

The Innu people of Labrador formally organized the Naskapi Montagnais Innu Association in 1976 to protect their rights, lands, and way of life against industrialization and other outside forces. The organization changed its name to the Innu Nation in 1990 and functions today as the governing body of the Labrador Innu. The group has won recognition for its members as status Indians under Canada's Indian Act in 2002 and is currently involved in land claim and self-governance negotiations with the federal and provincial governments.

In addition to the Innu Nation, residents at both Natuashish and Sheshatshiu elect Band Councils to represent community concerns. The chiefs of both councils sit on the Innu Nation's board of directors and the three groups work in cooperation with one another.

The Innu Nation's efforts to raise awareness about the environmental impacts of a mining project in Voisey's Bay were documented in Marjorie Beaucage's 1997 film Ntapueu ... i am telling the truth.

Davis Inlet, Labrador
In 1999, Survival International published a study of the Innu communities of Labrador.  It assessed the adverse effects of the Canadian government's relocating the people far from their ancestral lands and preventing them from practising their ancient way of life.  Survival International concluded that these policies violated contemporary international law in human rights, and drew parallels with the treatment of Tibetans by the People's Republic of China.  According to the study, from 1990–1997, the Innu community of Davis Inlet had a suicide rate more than twelve times the Canadian average, and well over three times the rate often observed in isolated northern villages.

By 2000, the Innu island community of Davis Inlet asked the Canadian government to assist with a local addiction public health crisis.  At their request, the community was relocated to a nearby mainland site, now known as Natuashish.  At the same time, the Canadian government created the Natuashish and Sheshatshiu band councils under the Indian Act.

Kawawachikamach, Quebec

The Naskapi Nation of Kawawachikamach, of Quebec, signed a comprehensive land claims settlement, the Northeastern Quebec Agreement; they did so in 1978. As a consequence, the Naskapi of Kawawachikamach are no longer subject to certain provisions of the Indian Act.  All the Innu communities of Quebec are still subject to the Act.

New York Power Authority controversy
The New York Power Authority's proposed contract in 2009 with the province of Quebec to buy power from its extensive hydroelectric dam facilities has generated controversy, because it was dependent on construction of a new dam complex and transmission lines that would have interfered with the traditional ways of the Innu.  According to the Sierra Club:

The Innu community, the Sierra Club, and the National Lawyers Guild are fighting to prevent this proposed contract, which would have to be approved by New York's Governor, under his regulatory authority.  The problem is that construction of required electric transmission lines would hinder the Innu's hunting-gathering-fishing lifestyle:

Chief Grégoire's comments at a press conference in Albany, New York were translated, but whether from French or Innu-aimun is not clear.

Natuashish and Sheshatshiu, Newfoundland and Labrador 

Although Innu have only been in Sheshatshiu since fur trading posts were established by the Hudson's Bay Company in Northwest River in the mid-1700s and only in Davis Inlet/Natuashish since the Moravians set up along the Inuit Coast in 1771, Newfoundland and Labrador Premier Danny Williams struck a deal on September 26, 2008 with Labrador's Innu to permit construction of a hydroelectric megaproject to proceed on the proposed Lower Churchill site.  They also negotiated compensation for another project on the Upper Churchill, where large tracts of Actual traditional Innu hunting lands were flooded.

Culture

Ethnobotany
The Innu people grate the inner bark of Abies balsamea and eat it to benefit the diet.

Traditional crafts
Traditional Innu craft is demonstrated in the Innu tea doll. These children's toys originally served a dual purpose for nomadic Innu tribes. When travelling vast distances over challenging terrain, the people left nothing behind.  They believed that "Crow" would take it away.  Everyone, including young children, helped to transport essential goods.  Innu women made intricate dolls from caribou hides and scraps of cloth.  They filled the dolls with tea and gave them to young girls to carry on long journeys.  The girls could play with the dolls while also carrying important goods. Every able-bodied person carried something. Men generally carried the heavier bags and women would carry young children.

Traditional clothing, style and accessories
Men wore caribou pants and boots with a buckskin long shirt, all made by women.  With the introduction of trade cloth from the French and English, people began replacing the buckskin shirts with ones made of cloth.  Most still wore boots and pants made from caribou hide.  Women wore long dresses of buckskin.  Contemporary Innu women have often replaced these with manufactured pants and jackets.  Women traditionally wore their hair long or in two coils.  Men wore theirs long.

Both genders wore necklaces made of bone and bead. Smoke pipes were used by both genders, marked for women as shorter. If a man killed a bear, it was a sign of joy and initiation into adulthood and the man would wear a necklace made from the bear's claws.

Housing
The houses of the Montagnais were cone shaped.  The Naskapi made long, domed houses covered in caribou hides.  These days the hearth is a metal stove in the centre of the house.

Traditional foods
Animals traditionally eaten included moose, caribou, porcupine, rabbits, marten, woodchuck, squirrel; Canada geese, snow geese, brants, ducks, teal, loons, spruce grouse, woodcock, snipe, passenger pigeons, ptarmigan; whitefish, lake trout, salmon, Arctic char, seal (naskapi) pike, walleye, suckerfish (Catostomidae), sturgeon, catfish, lamprey, and smelt.  Fish were eaten roasted or smoke-dried.  Moose meat and several types of fish were also smoked.  Bannock made from oats, introduced by the French in the 16th century, became a staple.  Meat was eaten frozen, raw or roasted, and caribou was sometimes boiled in a stew.  Pemmican was made with moose or caribou.

Plants traditionally eaten included raspberries, blueberries, strawberries, cherries, wild grapes, hazelnuts, crab apples, red martagon bulbs, Indian potato, and maple-tree sap for sweetening.  Cornmeal was traded with Iroquois, Algonquin, and Abenaki First Nations peoples, and made into apon (cornbread), which sometimes also included oat or wheat flour when it became available.  Pine-needle tea kept away infections and colds resulting from the harsh weather.

Buckskin
Traditionally, buckskin was a most important material used for clothing, boots, moccasins, house covers and storage.  Women prepared the hides and many of the products made from it.  They scraped the hides to remove all fur, then left them outside to freeze.  The next step was to stretch the hide on a frame.  They rubbed it with a mixture of animal brain and pine needle tea to soften it.  The dampened hide was formed into a ball and left overnight.  In the morning, it would be stretched again, then placed over a smoker to smoke and tan it.  The hide was left overnight.  The finished hide was called buckskin.

Mythology
The oral traditions of the Innu are noted as similar to those of other Cree-speaking cultures. Of particular relevance is Tshakapesh, a lunar folk hero.

The spirits they believed in are Caribou Master and Matshishkapeu.

Transportation

In traditional Innu communities, people walked or used snow shoes. While people still walk and use snow shoes where necessary for hunting or trapping, many Innu communities rely heavily on trucks, SUVs, and cars; in Northern Innu communities, people use snowmobiles for hunting and general transportation.

Notable people
The best-known members of the Innu nation are Kashtin, a popular Canadian folk rock duo in the 1980s and 1990s, and one of the most commercially successful and well-known First Nations musical groups. The band was formed in 1984 by Claude McKenzie and Florent Vollant, two Innu from the Maliotenam reserve in northern Quebec. 

Shauit, Scott-Pien Picard and Geneviève McKenzie-Sioui are singer-songwriters performing in the Innu language, while Matiu and Kanen perform in both Innu and French.

The writer and activist An Antane-Kapesh published the first book in French written by a First Nations woman in 1976, titled Je suis une maudite sauvagesse.

Laurie Rousseau-Nepton is an Innu astrophysicist.

Innu writers and poets include Joséphine Bacon, Natasha Kanapé Fontaine, Michel Jean, Rita Mestokosho, and Naomi Fontaine.

The first Innu ever elected to the House of Commons of Canada was Bernard Cleary, a Bloc Québécois MP first elected in the 2004 election.

Two Innu politicians, Peter Penashue of the Conservative Party and Jonathan Genest-Jourdain of the New Democratic Party, were elected to the House of Commons in the 2011 election, following which Penashue, as a member of the governing party caucus, became the first Innu person ever appointed to the Cabinet of Canada.

Jean-Luc Kanapé is a conservationist and actor who received a Canadian Screen Award nomination in 2023 for his performance in the film Nouveau Québec.

Citations

General bibliography 
 Rogers, Edward S., and Leacock, Eleanor (1981). "Montagnais-Naskapi". In J. Helm (Ed.), Handbook of North American Indians: Subarctic (Vol. 6, pp. 169–189). Washington: Smithsonian Institution.

External links 

 Official website of the Innu Nation of Labrador.
 Official website of the Naskapi Nation of Kawawachikamach, Quebec
 Article from: The Columbia Encyclopedia, Sixth Edition on the difference between Naskapi and Montagnais
 Website of the Tshikapisk Foundation (a non profit Innu organization focussing on social and cultural renewal)
 Virtual Museum of Canada - Tipatshimuna: Innu stories from the land
 Distinctions between "Naskapi", "Montagnais" and "Innu"
 Montagnais Indians (Quebec) - Article in the Catholic Encyclopedia
 CBC Digital Archives - Davis Inlet: Innu community in crisis
 Montagnais History

 
Algonquian peoples
Algonquian ethnonyms
Ethnic groups in Canada
Indigenous peoples in Canada